Gyula Bodrogi (born 15 April 1934) is a Hungarian television and film actor.

Selected filmography
 Sleepless Years (1959)
 Cantata (1963)
 Twenty Hours (1965)
 The Testament of Aga Koppanyi (1967)
 Irány Mexikó! (1968)
 Hatholdas rózsakert (1970)
 Do not Panic, Major Kardos (1982)
 Glass Tiger (2001)
 Magyar vándor (2004)
 Glass Tiger 2 (2006)
 A Fox's Tale (2008)

References

External links
 

1934 births
Living people
Hungarian male film actors
Male actors from Budapest
Hungarian male stage actors
Hungarian male television actors